The Milan tramway network is part of the public transport network of Milan, Italy, operated by Azienda Trasporti Milanesi (ATM).

While the Milan metro is characterized by a low level of centrality, with no more than two lines ever crossing each other at any of the interchange stations, the tram network is substantially centralized, with nearly half of the lines passing or terminating around Piazza del Duomo, the city central square.

History

Horses and steam (1876–93)

Following the establishment of omnibus services in 1841, Milan acquired its first trams on 8 July 1876, upon the inauguration of the Milan–Monza tramway, which was operated by animal traction.   The terminus of this line was at Porta Venezia, outside the city limits.

On 24 June 1877, a second tramway was opened between Milan and Saronno, with a terminus at Arco della Pace.

After only a few months, the city government agreed to the laying of rails in the city.  The line from Monza was therefore extended up to Piazza San Babila, and the line from Saronno through Piazza d'Armi to Via Cusani, inside the city limits.

A year later, on 6 June 1878, Milan's first steam tramway, to Vaprio, started operations.  The success of this line made steam power popular.  The existing line to Saronno was therefore extended (1878), and new lines were constructed to Sedriano (1879), Vimercate, Pavia and Lodi (1880), Giussano (1881), and elsewhere. These lines did not form a single network, but were awarded to different companies, and were operated from different termini.

Milan's first urban tramway network, with animal traction, was opened in 1881, at the National Exhibition.  This network was laid out radially, with a central terminus in Piazza del Duomo, and lines heading out towards the city gates.  It was managed by the Società Anonima degli Omnibus (English: Omnibus Public Limited Company) (SAO).

The Edison era (1893–1917)

In 1892, the Edison company presented a project for the electrification of the urban tramway network. The first stage of this project was an experimental line from Piazza del Duomo to Corso Sempione through new residential areas, to demonstrate the advantages of the new system. A year later works started on the rest of the project. By 1895, Edison had replaced the SAO in managing the network. Electrification was completed in 1901.

In 1910, following an expansion of the network, line numbering was introduced, using numbers from 1 to 30.

The early ATM years (1917–45)
In 1917, the comune of Milan assumed direct control of the city's tramway network, through the Ufficio Tramviario Municipale.  A new corporation, the Azienda Tranviaria Municipale (ATM), was established to manage the network's operations.

In 1926, the network was substantially reformed. The so-called "carousel" terminus in Piazza del Duomo, which had become a source of traffic problems for Milan's emerging automobile traffic, was closed.  The radial lines previously focused on that terminus were transformed into "V" shaped lines, which called instead at one of two terminals located relatively close together.  Additionally, in an effort to discourage passengers from taking unnecessarily long journeys, ATM started selling tickets for single trips, with no set period of validity.

From the following year, until 1930, the 502 members of the now famous series 1500 trams entered Milan's tramcar fleet.   These trams, many of which are still in service, were modelled on the then most modern American Peter Witt streetcars.

In 1931, a few tram lines were modified to serve the new Milano Centrale railway station, located several hundred metres north of its predecessor.

The first trolleybus routes in Milan commenced operations in 1933. However, in contrast with many Italian cities, Milan did not replace its trams with this new form of public transport. Trolleybuses were used instead to complement the trams on peripheral routes, and in particular, on Milan's outer ring road. The tramway network, which had been further extended, was still efficient (thanks to Milan's wide streets and many private homes), and was all double track, with spacious and modern tramcars. In the same year, many of the city's bus routes were extended, particularly to outside locations that had been annexed to the comune of Milan in 1923.

In 1939, the extensive long-distance tramway network, electrified in the previous decade by the Società Trazione Elettrica Lombarda (English: Electric Traction Company of Lombardy) (STEL), came under the management of ATM. The urban tramway network reached its peak in the same year. World War II caused serious damage to that network, but the damage was soon repaired.

Contraction and revival (1945–present)

After the war, trams came to be seen as an outdated and inflexible form of transportation for Milan.  The Piano Regolatore Generale Comunale (English: General Municipal Plan) (PRGC) of 1953 called for the complete elimination of trams from the city centre, and their replacement with an underground Metro network (a proposal that had already been made before the war).

Implementation of this plan began rapidly.  In 1957, work started on the excavation of the first Metro line, leading to the removal of tramway lines from some critical transport axes (Corso Buenos Aires, Corso Vittorio Emanuele, Via Dante, etc.). Closed sections of tramway were not later reinstated, but replaced by new bus routes (Viale Liguria, Via Canonica). On the other hand, two tramway extensions were opened, to serve the new suburbs of Taliedo (1964) and Gratosoglio (1969).

The 1950s and 1960s also saw the closure of almost all of Milan's interurban tramways, and their replacement by bus routes.

A further sharp contraction of the tram network took place on 9 March 1970. In conjunction with the introduction of time based ticketing (in place of tickets for single trips), the network was generally reorganised, with duplicated lines being eliminated. Two years later, trams also disappeared from Corso Garibaldi, to make way for the construction site of Metro line 2.

Nevertheless, the Milan tram network, although reduced, was still modernized. In 1971, new high capacity series 4800 Jumbotrams entered service.  Their construction had involved the joining together of body shells of older trams.

Until 1972, all trams carried conductors, but these were phased out between 1972 and 1979, except on the interurban lines, as ATM gradually converted its trams to one-man operation. Running parallel to that programme was ATM's conversion of its urban tram fleet from trolley pole current collection to pantographs, requiring modification of the overhead trolley wiring, which was spread out over several years for reasons of cost and practicality.   The conversion to one-man operation and use of pantographs began in August 1972, with a single route (then route 2), and was completed in early 1979 with route 23. The two interurban tram lines to Desio (with branch to Milanino) and Limbiate continued to use trolley-pole-equipped cars until autumn 1983 and October 1986, respectively.

In 1976, the series 4900 trams were ordered, in anticipation of the (never realized) transformation of the trolleybus circular route 90/91 into a light rail service. In 1981, the Via Larga tramway was opened, to reduce transit times in the city centre.

In the early 1990s, despite the opening of the Gratosoglio – Rozzano extension (1992), the tramway network suffered further cuts, triggered by the activation of the third Metro line.

Only in 1994 did a process of revival of the tramways begin, with the establishment of new lines, the restoration of abandoned sections, and the drafting of new guidelines to be implemented to modern standards (fast tram). New tramway lines could therefore be constructed to Bicocca (2002), Niguarda (2003), Porta Lodovica-Piazza Abbiategrasso (2003), Precotto (2007) and Cinisello (2009).

Additionally, the tram fleet has been renewed since the early 1990s, with the entry into service of new series 7000 trams (ADtranz Eurotrams), and the even newer series 7100/7500/7600 trams (Ansaldobreda Sirio and "Sirietto" models), to replace many old trams, of series 1500 and 4800.

Services

The Milan tramway network comprises the following lines:

Urban lines
 1 Via Martiri Oscuri, Greco ↔ Roserio
 2 Piazza Bausan, Bovisa ↔ Piazzale Negrelli, Restocco
 3 Duomo ↔ Gratosoglio
 4 Piazza Castello ↔ Niguarda (Metrotranvia Nord)
 5 Via Milesi, Ortica ↔ Niguarda Hospital
 7 Piazzale Lagosta ↔ Via Anassagora, Precotto (Metrotranvia di Bicocca)
 9 Milano Centrale ↔ Milano Porta Genova
 10 Viale Lunigiana, Maggiolina ↔ Porta Ticinese
 12 Roserio ↔ Viale Molise, Calvairate
 14 Cimitero Maggiore ↔ Lorenteggio
 15 Duomo ↔ Rozzano (Via Guido Rossa) (Metrotranvia Sud)
 16 San Siro Stadium ↔ Via Monte Velino, Calvairate
 19 Lambrate FS ↔ Piazza Castelli, Villapizzone
 24 Piazza Fontana ↔ Via Selvanesco, Vigentino
 27 Piazza Fontana ↔ Viale Ungheria, Morsenchio
 31 Bicocca ↔ Cinisello Balsamo (Via I Maggio) (Metrotranvia di Cinisello)
 33 Piazzale Lagosta ↔ Viale Rimembranze, Lambrate

Interurban lines (discontinued)
 178 Niguarda ↔ Desio (Metrotranvia Milano-Desio) (discontinued from late 2011)
 179 Comasina ↔ Limbiate (Metrotranvia Milano-Limbiate) (discontinued from 2022)

Rolling stock

Retired series

In the past, the Milan urban network has been served by the following tramcar series, now retired:

 "Edison" (the last one decommissioned in the early 1960s);
 Series 600 (decommissioned in the 1960s);
 Series 700 (in service until the 1960s, and then rebuilt for internal use as sand spreaders, snowplows, etc.);
 Series 3000 (decommissioned in the 1960s);
 Series 4000 (the last one decommissioned in the 1970s);
 Series 4500 (decommissioned in the mid 1960s);
 Series 4800 (ATM/Mauri JumboTram - , three sections) (decommissioned at the end of 2010);
 Series 5000 (the last decommissioned at the end of the 1970s);
 Series 5100 (decommissioned in 1986);
 Series 5200 and 5300 (used in the 1970s to build the Series 4800 trams);
 Series 5400 (one used to build the prototype 4801; two sold to ATAC in Rome and then scrapped).

Current fleet
Still in service on the Milan urban network are tramcars of the following series:

 Series 1500;
 Series 4600 (Stanga/Tibb - 2 sections);
 Series 4700 (Stanga/Tibb - 2 sections);
 Series 4900 (Fiat Ferroviaria and OMS JumboTram - , 3 sections);
 Series 7000 (ADtranz Eurotram - , 7 sections - design by Zagato);
 Series 7100 (Ansaldobreda Sirio - , 7 sections - design by Pininfarina);
 Series 7500 (Ansaldobreda Sirio - , 5 sections - design by Pininfarina);
 Series 7600 (Ansaldobreda Sirio - , 5 sections - design by Pininfarina).

Depots

Milan and its hinterland have several depots for the maintenance and refurbishing of trams.

The ATM operates seven depots (five urban and two interurban), at the following addresses:

 Via Ruggero Leoncavallo, 32 - Milano
 Via Messina, 41 - Milano
 Via Forze Armate, 80 - Milano (known as Baggio depot)
 Via Pietro Custodi, 7 - Milano (known as Porta Ticinese depot)
 Via Anassagora (Precotto) - Milano
 Via Milano, 4 - Varedo (interurban depot)
 Corso Italia, 150 - Desio (interurban depot, currently abandoned)

Projects 
The southernmost section of Via Ripamonti, running from the Vigentino neighbourhood to the municipal border with Opera is being prepared for an eventual extension of line 24, but no procurement for actual track-laying and tram operation has been approved as of March 2016.

See also

List of town tramway systems in Italy
Railway stations in Milan
History of rail transport in Italy
Rail transport in Italy

References

Notes

Bibliography

External links

 Images of the Milan tramway network, at photorail.com
 Images of the Milan tramway network, at railfaneurope.net

This article is based upon a translation of the Italian language version as at March 2011.

Milan
Transport in Milan
Railway lines in Lombardy
Tourist attractions in Milan
1876 establishments in Italy
1445 mm gauge railways
600 V DC railway electrification
Milan